A list of films produced in the Cinema of Mexico ordered by year of release in the 1960s. For an alphabetical list of articles on Mexican films see :Category:Mexican films.

1960
 List of Mexican films of 1960

1961
 List of Mexican films of 1961

1962
 List of Mexican films of 1962

1963
 List of Mexican films of 1963

1964
 List of Mexican films of 1964

1965
 List of Mexican films of 1965

1966
 List of Mexican films of 1966

1967
 List of Mexican films of 1967

1968
 List of Mexican films of 1968

1969
 List of Mexican films of 1969

External links
 Mexican film at the Internet Movie Database

Mexican
Films

fr:Liste de films mexicains
zh:墨西哥電影列表